In enzymology, a glycoprotein O-fatty-acyltransferase is an enzyme that catalyzes the chemical reaction

palmitoyl-CoA + mucus glycoprotein  CoA + O-palmitoylglycoprotein

Thus, the two substrates of this enzyme are palmitoyl-CoA and mucus glycoprotein, whereas its two products are CoA and O-palmitoylglycoprotein.

This enzyme belongs to the family of transferases, specifically those acyltransferases transferring groups other than aminoacyl groups.  The systematic name of this enzyme class is fatty-acyl-CoA:mucus-glycoprotein fatty-acyltransferase. This enzyme is also called protein acyltransferase.

References

 

EC 2.3.1
Enzymes of unknown structure